Christ Episcopal Church is a historic Episcopal church located at 120 Ohio Street in Huron, Ohio, in the United States. On March 4, 1975, it was added to the National Register of Historic Places.

History
Christ Episcopal Church was organized in 1837 and its church building dates from 1838.

Current use
Christ Episcopal Church is still an active parish in the Episcopal Diocese of Ohio.
The church is interviewing for a new rector. The church website is www.christchurchhuron.org

See also

 List of Registered Historic Places in Erie County, Ohio
 Christ Episcopal Church (disambiguation)

References

External links

 National Register listings for Erie County, Ohio
 Christ Episcopal Church website
 Christ Episcopal Church history

National Register of Historic Places in Erie County, Ohio
Churches on the National Register of Historic Places in Ohio
Episcopal churches in Ohio
Churches in Erie County, Ohio
Huron, Ohio